Ruth-Marion Baruch (1922–1997) was an American photographer remembered for her pictures of the San Francisco Bay Area in the 1960s.

Early life and education 
Baruch was born in Berlin on June 15, 1922. She and her family migrated in 1927 to the United States. She gained a BA in English and Journalism from the University of Missouri in 1944. She studied photography at Ohio University, receiving an MFA in 1946 and at the California School of Fine Arts (now the San Francisco Art Institute) in San Francisco 1946-1949 in the first class of students taught by Ansel Adams, Minor White,  Dorothea Lange, Homer Page, and Edward Weston after World War II.

Photography 
Baruch's work includes a series on the Black Panther Party taken from July to October 1968, in collaboration with photographer Pirkle Jones, and a series on the hippies of Haight-Ashbury. Baruch's photographs were exhibited in Perceptions at the San Francisco Museum of Art in 1954, as well as Edward Steichen's New York Museum of Modern Art exhibition, The Family of Man in 1955.

Exhibitions 
 “Walnut Grove: Portrait of a Town," collaboration with Pirkle Jones, exhibited at the San Francisco Museum of Art, 1964. 
 “Illusion For Sale,” San Francisco Museum of Art, 1965.
 Haight Ashbury, San Francisco's M.H. de Young Museum, 1968
 A Photographic Essay on the Black Panthers, collaboration with Pirkle Jones, exhibited de Young Museum, December 1968 through February 1969. This exhibition travels to the Studio Museum of Harlem in 1969. The Vanguard: A Photographic Essay on the Black Panthers, (Boston: Beacon Press, 1970).

References

External links
 All Ruth-Marion Baruch Images Online, released by Center for Creative Photography (CCP), University of Arizona.
 Catalogue description of Baruch's book of poetry, A Dangerous Thing, featuring a short biographical note

20th-century American photographers
1922 births
1997 deaths
Ohio University alumni
20th-century American women photographers
German emigrants to the United States